is the second album of Japanese idol girl group Nogizaka46. It was released on May 25, 2016. It was number-one on the weekly Oricon Albums Chart, with 274,873 copies sold. It was also number-one on the Billboard Japan Hot 100. In May 2016, the album was certified Platinum by the Recording Industry Association of Japan.

Release 
It was released in 5 types. Type-A, Type-B, Type-C, Type-D and a regular edition. Each type has a limited edition. Type-A, Type-B and Type-C includes a DVD with the live music video Nogizaka46 Summer National Tour 2014 Final! @Meiji Jingu Stadium. Type-D includes special movies shot by their manager. The album cover photo was taken in The National Art Center where connected directly to Tokyo Metro Nogizaka Station.

Track listing

Regular Edition

Type A

Type B

Type C

Type D

Charts

Certifications

References

Further reading

External links 
 Discography on Nogizaka46 Official Website

2016 albums
2016 songs
Japanese-language songs
Nogizaka46 songs